Spastic intestinal obstruction is an obstruction of the intestine that causes a result closure of an intestinal segment due to intestinal wall spasms (often located in one place and persist). Dr Murphy (1896) was the first to describe this disease. It is clinically and extremely rare, but it does show its presence.

Esophagael dysphagia without identifying this early will cause further problems.

References 

Symptoms and signs: Digestive system and abdomen